James Gathers (June 17, 1930 – June 1, 2002) was an American athlete who competed mainly in the 200 metres. He competed for the United States in the 1952 Summer Olympics held in Helsinki, Finland in the 200 metres where he won the bronze medal.

References

American male sprinters
Olympic bronze medalists for the United States in track and field
Athletes (track and field) at the 1952 Summer Olympics
1930 births
2002 deaths
Medalists at the 1952 Summer Olympics